Riteish Vilasrao Deshmukh (born 17 December 1978) is an Indian film actor, producer and architect. He is known for his work in Hindi and Marathi cinema.

Deshmukh debuted with K. Vijaya Bhaskar's Tujhe Meri Kasam (2003) opposite Genelia D'Souza, but it was not until 2004 that he achieved huge popularity, when he appeared in the commercially successful comedy Masti and the critically acclaimed Bardaasht.

Since then, Riteish Deshmukh has starred in many commercially successful films such as Kya Kool Hai Hum, Bluffmaster!, Malamaal Weekly, Heyy Babyy, Dhamaal, Housefull, Tere Naal Love Ho Gaya, Housefull 2, Grand Masti, Ek Villain, and Housefull 3.

In January 2013, Riteish made his debut as a film producer with the Marathi success Balak Palak, directed by Ravi Jadhav. The following year he made his acting debut in Marathi cinema with the action film Lai Bhaari.

Awards and nominations

References

External links
 

Lists of awards received by Indian actor